Yoo Jun-sang (born November 28, 1969) is a South Korean actor and singer. Yoo is best known for starring in the Hong Sang-soo films Ha Ha Ha (2010), The Day He Arrives (2011), and In Another Country (2012). He was also praised for his supporting roles in Wide Awake (2007) and Moss (2010), and gained newfound popularity in 2012 because of the TV drama My Husband Got a Family. Aside from film and television, Yoo is also active in musical theatre, notably in The Three Musketeers, Jack the Ripper and The Days.

Career
Yoo Jun-sang graduated from Dongguk University with a bachelor's degree in Theater and Film and a master's degree in Theater Arts. Having kicked off his career in 1995 through SBS's open auditions, Yoo built a stable acting career through films and TV series. He also stars in stage musicals, notably Claws of Angel, The Three Musketeers, Jack the Ripper, Rebecca, Kim Kwang-seok jukebox musical The Days, and Frankenstein. Additionally, Yoo has been a full-time faculty member at the Korea Arts Institute since 2010.

He gave a memorable supporting turn as a cynical prosecutor in 2010's Moss, the blockbuster mystery film based on a popular online comic series. His performance garnered him Best Supporting Actor wins at the Buil Film Awards and Chunsa Film Art Awards. He also won Best Supporting Actor at the Grand Bell Awards for the 2007 medical thriller Wide Awake.

But Yoo is best known as a regular in the films of auteur Hong Sang-soo. He headlined The Day He Arrives in 2011, which netted him the Best Actor prize at the Busan Film Critics Awards. He also starred in Ha Ha Ha, which won the top prize in the Un Certain Regard section of the 2010 Cannes Film Festival, at which Yoo and his fellow cast members walked the red carpet. When asked to describe the actor, Hong said that "Yoo is... a kind person." [...] I just... like him. I like him a lot. He is someone with a drive that doesn't irritate me. His honesty doesn't irritate me either and I like his energy. His energy has a clean color. And I think he's a lot of help when we work together." The director cast him opposite renowned French actress Isabelle Huppert in Hong's first English-language film In Another Country. He described Huppert as "a real joy" to work with, while she praised him as "kind and charismatic." Yoo was singled out in The Hollywood Reporter review as the film's scene-stealer.

After a five-year absence from television, he returned in the series My Husband Got a Family (also known as Unexpected You) co-starring Kim Nam-joo. The drama was a big hit, it not only consistently topped its timeslot throughout its long run, but ranked number one on the 2012 yearly TV ratings chart. As a result, Yoo enjoyed his biggest surge of mainstream popularity since his debut, landing commercial contracts and gaining the nickname "Nation's son-in-law".

In 2012, he published his memoir titled The Invention of Happiness. Yoo said he began writing diaries back in university when his professor recommended that he try filling up at least one journal each year with personal reflections. The book contained highlights from his 20 years of journaling life—from his days as a college student, moments on the set of several productions to his travels and vacations—as well as poems and sketches made by the actor in his everyday life. He donated all of the proceeds from the book to charity, especially to impoverished children.

For the aerial action blockbuster R2B: Return to Base, Yoo along with the rest of the cast had to undergo months-long physical training for their role as jet fighter pilots. The actors also had to pass mandatory tests for actual pilots to be able to get into the cockpit—in a low-pressure chamber, emergency escape routine, simulated flight as well as training to develop tolerance for acceleration. Yoo reportedly passed out twice before he passed his 6G test, only passing on his third attempt.

Yoo underwent knee surgery after an injury to his cruciate ligament while filming Fists of Legend. The action movie revolved around a group of middle-aged men who fight on a reality show for a cash prize. On December 19, 2013, he released his first album, titled Junes; besides singing, Yoo composed, wrote the lyrics and produced all the seven songs included. Yoo's second album, J N Joy 20: Travel Project One, Just Travel... Walking... and Thinking..., was a collaboration with guitarist Lee Jun-hwa and released on November 13, 2014, followed by his first concert.

Personal life
Besides acting, singing and writing, Yoo can also play several musical instruments including guitar, saxophone, violin and the piano. In December 2012, he showcased 20 of his artwork at the Art Asia fair.

He married actress Hong Eun-hee in 2003, and they have two sons named Yoo Dong-woo and Yoo Min-jae. Dong-woo appeared in the 2011 short film Modern Family.

In the talk show Healing Camp, he spoke about his love for his widowed mother, who suffered a cerebral hemorrhagic stroke in 2011.

Filmography

Film

Television series

Music video

Theater

Discography

Book

Ambassadorship 
 Public Relations Ambassador for the Park Kyung-ri Literature Awards (2022)

Awards and nominations

Listicles

References

External links

 Yu Jun-sang at Namoo Actors
 
 
 

 

South Korean male film actors
South Korean male television actors
South Korean male stage actors
South Korean male musical theatre actors
1968 births
Living people
People from Seoul
Male actors from Seoul
Dongguk University alumni
21st-century South Korean male actors